Bart Buysse (born 16 October 1986) is a Belgian footballer who plays as a left back for Belgian club SV Oostkamp.

Club career
On 1 July 2010 it was confirmed that Buysse would be moving from Zulte-Waregem to FC Twente, where he stayed until the summer of 2012 before moving to Club Brugge. In July 2013, he signed a two-year contract with Cercle Brugge. In the summer of 2015, he moves a free player to NEC Nijmegen.

Honours
Twente
KNVB Cup: 2010–11
Johan Cruyff Shield: 2011

References

External links
 
 

1986 births
Living people
Belgian footballers
Belgium under-21 international footballers
S.V. Zulte Waregem players
FC Twente players
Club Brugge KV players
Cercle Brugge K.S.V. players
NEC Nijmegen players
Belgian Pro League players
Eredivisie players
Belgian expatriate footballers
Expatriate footballers in the Netherlands
People from Beernem
Association football defenders
Footballers from West Flanders